|}

 		

The WKD Hurdle is a Grade 2 National Hunt hurdle race in Ireland which is open to horses aged four years or older. It is run at Down Royal over a distance of about 2 miles and half a furlong (2 miles and 100 yards, or 3,310 metres), and it is scheduled to take place each year in late October or early November.

The race was first run in 2001.  It was awarded Grade 3 status in 2006 and further raised to Grade 2 status in 2010.  The race was previously run as the Anglo Irish Bank Hurdle.

Records

Leading jockey since 2001 (5 wins):
 Paul Carberry – Scottish Memories (2002), Khetaam (2003), Iktitaf (2006), Aitmatov (2007), Monksland (2012)

Leading trainer since 2001 (6 wins):
 Noel Meade – Scottish Memories (2002), Khetaam (2003), Iktitaf (2006), Aitmatov (2007), Jered (2008), Monksland (2012)

Winners

See also
 Horse racing in Ireland
 List of Irish National Hunt races

References
Racing Post:

Down Royal Racecourse
National Hunt hurdle races
National Hunt races in Ireland
Horse races in Northern Ireland
Recurring sporting events established in 2001
2001 establishments in Northern Ireland